Eupera bahamensis is a mollusk species that inhabits fresh waters of the Bahamas in the Caribbean. E. bahamensis was first described in 1938 on Cat Island by William J. Clench. The species rank is accepted and has no known subspecies.

References 

Sphaeriidae
Endemic fauna of the Bahamas
Freshwater bivalves
Molluscs described in 1938
Taxa named by William J. Clench